George Alexander Burrows (9 October 1910 – 8 July 1987) was a Canadian swimmer. He competed in three events at the 1932 Summer Olympics.

References

External links
 
 
 

1910 births
1987 deaths
Canadian male swimmers
Olympic swimmers of Canada
Swimmers at the 1932 Summer Olympics
Swimmers from Vancouver